White Hall is an unincorporated community in Cecil County, Maryland, United States.

References

Unincorporated communities in Cecil County, Maryland
Unincorporated communities in Maryland
Maryland populated places on the Chesapeake Bay